The Ghana National Association of Teachers (GNAT) is a trade union representing school and college teachers in Ghana.

The union was founded on 14 July 1962, on the initiative of teachers, many former members of the Ghana Union of Teachers, who did not want to be linked with the Ghana Trade Union Congress (TUC).  The Government of Ghana permitted the formation on the condition that it was registered as a voluntary association, not a trade union.  On formation, the union had 24,384 members.

The union grew steadily, and by 2012 it had 194,000 members, falling slightly to 178,000 in 2018.

References

Further reading

Education trade unions
Trade unions established in 1962
Trade unions in Ghana